There are no original works of philosophy in the Coptic language. All surviving philosophical passages in Coptic are of Greek origin and many are anonymous. Mostly they deal with ethics and are treated like wisdom literature. Only a few texts have been edited and published.

Among the named philosophers quoted in Coptic are Anacharsis, Diogenes and Plato. A translation of an excerpt from Plato's Republic (588A–589B) has been found in the Nag Hammadi library, but it is a poor translation, extensively reworked to better conform with Gnostic teaching. Many leaves of a Coptic manuscript consisting of philosophical texts, fables with Christian interpretations and explicitly Christian texts survive dispersed between libraries in Vienna and London. The manuscript was probably compiled in Akhmim, a centre of Greek learning into the 6th century and also a late redoubt of Egyptian paganism. One of the anonymous sayings from the Vienna fragments that cannot be identified with any Greek text is this:
It is better to do good to a dog and a lion than to feed a thankless person. When the dog and the lion become tame, they remain friends of those who feed them. The disorderly person not only does not remain a friend but you will find that when you are doing him a favour, he is trying to rob your house and deliver you into the hands of your enemies.
Although many writings of the Church Fathers contain extensive philosophizing, few of these are known to have been translated into Coptic. The most notable is Gregory of Nyssa's De anima et resurrectione, a piece of philosophical theology that includes references to Plato's Phaedrus. The native Coptic saint Shenoute also references Plato in his writings. Some philosophy, or at least Plato, seems to have been a standard part of a Coptic education in the first centuries AD.

Conflicting Coptic attitudes to Greek philosophy are apparent in several sources. Socrates of Constantinople records that when the Greek monk Evagrius Ponticus went to the Coptic monastic complex of Kellia in Egypt, he spent fourteen years as a calligrapher learning the Coptic language. He became a disciple of Macarius of Egypt and Macarius of Alexandria, "acquiring from them the philosophy of deeds whereas before he only knew the philosophy of words". In this passage, Socrates uses "philosophy" in its original sense (love of wisdom), even citing the definition of philosophy in Plato's Phaedo, i.e., the "practice of dying". The Coptic letters of Anthony the Great (died 356) treat the quest of philosophy and Christianity as the same (wisdom), but the hagiographic Life of Anthony portrays its subject as an implacable foe of the philosophers.

Some later Copts wrote philosophy or philosophical theology in Arabic. The Kitāb al-Burhān, written by Ibn al-Rāhib in 1270–71, combines theology, ethics and philosophy. It contains a theodicy based on that of the Islamic theologian Fakhr al-Dīn al-Rāzī.

In modern times, and especially with the strong French and British influence during the colonial period, there was a resurgence of Coptic philosophical writing. Two notable examples of modern Coptic philosophers are Bishop Gregorius (General Bishop of Higher Studies) and Zakariyya Ibrahim.


See also
Ancient Egyptian philosophy
Coptic literature

Notes

Bibliography

External links
Plato, Republic 588A–589B, translated by James Brashler from The Gnostic Society Library
Plato's Republic at Nag Hammadi c.350 CE: Comparing the Gnostic with the Original

Ancient Egyptian philosophy
Early Christianity and Gnosticism
Coptic literature
Christian philosophy